Hew Campbell of Loudon (died 1561) was a Scottish landowner.

He was a son of Hugh Campbell of Loudon and Isobel Wallace.

Campbell was Sheriff of Ayr. His first name is sometimes spelled "Hugh" or "Huw". He signed his name "Hew Campbell".

Gilbert Kennedy, 2nd Earl of Cassilis was murdered at Prestwick by the followers of Hew Campbell of Loudon, sheriff of Ayr in August 1527, over a quarrel about the lands of Turnberry.

Marriage and family
He married Elizabeth Stewart, a daughter of Matthew Stewart, 2nd Earl of Lennox and Elizabeth Hamilton. He married secondly, Agnes Drummond, a daughter of John Drummond of Innerpeffray and Margaret Stewart. 
His children included:
Matthew Campbell of Loudon
Margaret Campbell, who married Thomas Kennedy of Bargany

After his death, his widow Agnes Drummond, married Hugh Montgomerie, 3rd Earl of Eglinton, and subsequently, Patrick Drummond, 3rd Lord Drummond.

References

1561 deaths
16th-century Scottish people